Tess Mallos  (née Anastasia Calopades) (25 January 1933 – 31 July 2012)  was an Australian food and cooking writer, journalist, author, and commentator. She wrote a number of books on Greek and Middle Eastern cuisine.

Biography
Her parents, both from the Greek island of Kythera, emigrated to Australia where she was born and raised in the country town of Casino, New South Wales. Her father, Andonis Calopades arrived in Australia at the turn of the 20th century as an 11-year-old, and worked in the famous Kominos cafe in the central business district of Sydney. In 1919, he moved to Casino, where he ran the Marble Bar Cafe. Her mother was Calliope Manolliaras.

Mallos began her writing career in cooking as a freelance food consultant in advertising, creating and writing recipes for a wide range of food as well as preparing food for photography. Her first book in 1976 was the Greek Cook Book, which featured familiar recipes from her Greek heritage. Many books followed featuring recipes gathered from cuisines in the Mediterranean, Middle East and North Africa.

Mallos worked as food consultant to the Australian Meat Board, where she wrote editorials on meat cooking for some 80 publications throughout Australia, and 20 overseas countries. She also demonstrated her recipes in cooking segments on a number of Australian television cooking shows.

Mallos had three children.

Bibliography
 Greek Cook Book  
 The Complete Mediterranean Cookbook 
 Turkish Cooking 
 Middle Eastern Cooking 
 The Complete Middle East Cookbook 
 Cooking of the Gulf: Bahrain, Kuwait, Oman, Qatar, Saudi Arabia, United Arab Emirates 
 Cooking Moroccan 
 North African Cooking 
 Cooking in Colour 
 Olive Oil 
 Fillo Pastry Cookbook 
 Middle Eastern Home Cooking 
 Bean Cook Book 
 The Barbecue Cookbook: For Kettle Grills & Other Covered Barbecues 
 The Made in Australia Food Book: With Over 200 Recipes 
 Meat Cookbook 
 The Australian Book of Meat Cookery 
 The Food of Morocco 
 The Little Moroccan Cookbook

References

1933 births
2012 deaths
Australian people of Greek descent
Australian food writers
Australian non-fiction writers
Australian women writers
Women food writers
Women cookbook writers